Robert John Colville (born 27 April 1963) is a former professional footballer who played as a striker in the Football League for Oldham Athletic, Bury, Stockport County and York City, in non-League football for Spennymoor United, Barrow and Guiseley, in Welsh football for Rhos United and Bangor City and in Canada with Kitchener Spirit. He was a Wales semi-pro international.

References

1963 births
Living people
Sportspeople from Nuneaton
English footballers
Welsh footballers
Wales semi-pro international footballers
Association football forwards
Oldham Athletic A.F.C. players
Bury F.C. players
Stockport County F.C. players
York City F.C. players
Spennymoor United F.C. players
Bangor City F.C. players
Barrow A.F.C. players
Guiseley A.F.C. players
English Football League players
Kitchener Spirit players
Canadian Soccer League (1987–1992) players